The 1884 Lafayette football team was an American football team that represented Lafayette College as an independent during the 1884 college football season. Playing without a regular coach, the team compiled a 2–5 record and was outscored by a total of 261 to 88. Lewis Frey was the team captain, and F. Drake was the manager. The team played its home games on The Quad in Easton, Pennsylvania.

On October 29, 1884, Lafayette lost to Princeton by a 140–0 score. Princeton's 140 points was the highest score achieved by a team in the history of the sport to that time.

Schedule

References

Lafayette
Lafayette Leopards football seasons
Lafayette football